Amrapali is a 1966 historical Hindi film directed by Lekh Tandon, starring Sunil Dutt and Vyjayanthimala as leads. The film's music was by Shankar–Jaikishan.

It was based on the life of Amrapali (Ambapali), the nagarvadhu (royal courtesan) of Vaishali in present-day Bihar, the capital of the Licchavi republic in ancient India around 500 BC, and Ajatashatru, the Haryanka dynasty king of the Magadha empire, who falls in love with her. Although he destroys Vaishali to get her, she has been transformed by her encounter with Gautama Buddha in the meantime, of whom she becomes a disciple and an Arahant. Her story is mentioned in old Pali texts and Buddhist traditions.

The film was selected as the Indian entry for the Best Foreign Language Film at the 39th Academy Awards, but was not accepted as a nominee. Although the film was not a commercial success, its reputation has grown over time and it is now regarded as a classic of Hindi cinema. It is remembered for its dramatic war scenes, distinctive costumes by Bhanu Athaiya and strong anti-war sentiment.

Shah Rukh Khan's Red Chillies Entertainment own the rights to the film.

Plot 
His hunger for conquest not satiated, even after repeated victories, Samrat (king) Ajaatshatru (Sunil Dutt) of Magadh would like to continue on his winning spree, as the only unconquered city is that of Vaishali (ancient city). His astrologers forewarn him; his Senapati (Prem Nath) cautions him that his army is tired and needs to rest; his very own mother refuses to let take part in any war - but he refuses to listen to anyone and hastens to war - which leads to subsequent defeat at the hands of the Vaishali army. Wounded, lost, and on the run from enemy soldiers, Ajaatshatru dons the guise of a Vaishali soldier and takes shelter with a woman named Amrapali (Vyjayanthimala). She nurses him back to health but Amrapali doesn't know that he is the Ajatashatru of Magadh yet they fall in love with each other.

Ajatashatru finds an ally in Senapati Badbadhra Singh (K. N. Singh) and both start to plot against Vaishali - this time by reducing the number of soldiers, making them addicted to alcohol, poor training methods, and poor pay - thus demoralizing them, and paving the way for an easy victory for Magadh. Amrapali, winning a dance competition, is crowned the Rajnarthaki (Royal Dancer) of Vaishali. She is known to everyone as a true patriot. One day, she finds out that the soldier she loves is none other than Ajatashatru. Being a true patriot, she breaks all ties with him and tells him to never see her again. Heartbroken, she tells the ruler of Vaishali that she would like to leave the position of Rajnarthaki. The members of the court put pressure on her and everyone finds out that she had fallen in love with Ajatashatru and declare her as a traitor.

The ruler of Vaishali sentences her to life in a dungeon and orders to kill her on a full moon night. Ajaatshatru, who is enraged to hear this, gathers his army, and storms the unsuspecting people of Vaishali and virtually burns the city down, killing almost everyone in it. He then rushes to free his beloved from the dungeons. He does set her free - but it is not the same Amrapali - this Amrapali is quite different and not at all thrilled to be in the presence of her conqueror lover. She is taken by him to the battlefield and is shown everyone he killed just to get her. She is horrified to see so much bloodshed. She tells she can't live like this anymore and surrenders herself to Gautama Buddha. Ajatashatru also follows her and surrenders himself.

Cast
 Sunil Dutt – Magadh Samrat Ajatashatru
 Vyjayanthimala – Amrapali
 Prem Nath – Senpati Veer of Magadh
 Bipin Gupta – Vaishali's Samrat
 Gajanan Jagirdar – Kulpati Mahanam
 K.N. Singh – Balbadra SIngh
 Madhavi – Raj Nartaki
 Mridula Rani – Raj Mata (Ajaat Shatru's Mother)
 Ruby Myers – Vaishali's Empress
 Narendra Nath – Gautama Buddha
 Baburao Pendharkar – Vaishali samrat's advisor (in the song Neel Gagan Ki...)
 Bela Bose - Vaishali village girl
 Randhir (actor) - Som, Kulpati's son
 Nazir Kashmiri
 Keshav Rana - Vaishali soldier
 Gopi Krishna - Lead dancer, in celebration dance

Crew
 Art Direction: M.R. Acharekar
 Dance director: Gopi Krishna 
 Costume Design: Bhanu Athaiya

Music

Another highlight of the film was its music by the duo Shankar Jaikishan, then at the peak of their career, who gave a highly restrained yet fully Indian classical music-based score in the four songs, another rarity in the period film of the era to have so few songs. All the songs were sung by Lata Mangeshkar who also has some of her career's finest among them, including,  "Tumhen Yaad Karte Karte", "Neel Gagan Ki Chhaon Mein"  and  "Jao Re Jogi".

Track list

In popular culture
A scene from the film is used in the Dhoom tana song video in film Om Shanti Om (2007), wherein Deepika Padukone dances as Vyjayantimala's Amrapali. The latter was digitally removed from the frames, as Deepika was playing an actor of the 1970s.

See also
 List of historical drama films of Asia
 List of submissions to the 39th Academy Awards for Best Foreign Language Film
 List of Indian submissions for the Academy Award for Best Foreign Language Film
 Chitralekha (1964)

References

External links
 
 Amrapali-1966 full Film

1966 films
1960s Hindi-language films
Indian biographical films
Indian historical films
Films set in the 6th century BC
Films set in ancient India
Films about Buddhism
Films directed by Lekh Tandon
Films scored by Shankar–Jaikishan
Works about the Maurya Empire
Films about women in India
Films set in Bihar
Films set in the Magadha Empire
Cultural depictions of Gautama Buddha
1960s biographical films
1960s historical films
Films about courtesans in India